Electoral reform in New Mexico refers to efforts to change election and voting laws in this arid U.S. state.

Alternate voting systems
The Constitution of New Mexico specifies that the plurality candidate must be declared elected. There have been proposals in New Mexico to use instant runoff voting as a result of Green Party candidates contributing to Republican victories by acting as spoilers in House races. Specifically, the New Mexico State Senate came close to approving a constitutional amendment in 1998 to allow IRV with a favorable vote in the Rules Committee and a tie vote in the subsequent committee.

Allocation of electoral votes
 
In 2007, SB 666 was introduced to allocate New Mexico's 5 electoral votes to the winner of the nationwide popular vote, but it failed.

References

New Mexico
Politics of New Mexico